Haryana Waqf Board is a statutory board of the Government of Haryana in India.

History
Central Wakf Council was set up by the Government of India's Ministry of Minority Affairs, as an Indian statutory body in 1964 under Wakf Act, 1954 (now a sub section the Wakf Act, 1995) for the purpose of advising it on matters pertaining to working of the State Wakf Boards and proper administration of the Wakfs in the country. Wakf is a permanent dedication of movable or immovable properties for  religious, pious or charitable purposes as recognized by Muslim Law, given by philanthropists. The grant is known as mushrut-ul-khidmat, while a person making such dedication is known as Wakif.

Prior to 1966 when Haryana became a separate state, the State of Haryana was under the Punjab Waqf Board. The States of Punjab, India, Haryana, Himachal Pradesh and Union Territory of Chandigarh created own separate Waqf Boards.

The separate Haryana Waqf Board, was established by the Government of Haryana state under Central Wakf Council,  under section 13 (1) of the Haryana Waqf Act, 1995 (Act No. 43 of 1995) on 1 August 2003 vide Government of Haryana Notification No. 18/2/96-3JJ (I), dated 1.8.2003.

Properties
The Haryana Waqf Board earned  an income or INR 28.62 crore (INR 286 million) in 2012-13. It manages 12,505 waqf properties in Haryana state, including 4272 Mosques in the State of which 365 have been surveyed by the Waqf board. It pays monthly salary to 333 Imams, pension to poor Muslim widows, scholarships to poor Muslim students and operates Ghausia Dispensary in Panipat.

Dr. Hanif Qureshi, IPS, Commissioner of Police, Faridabad-cum-Chief Executive Officer, Haryana Waqf Board addressed the AGM on 13 September 2016, with annual report of works done & achievements achieved for serving the community and securing waqf lands & generating whopping record breaking revenue collection of Rs. 18.68 Crore for the year ending 2016.

According to Dr. Qureshi the board has decided to increase the revenue by over 20 per cent. Spreading education among Muslims has been the prime objective of the board. To achieve this target, it has decided to open three more schools. During the last financial year, Rs 2.03 crore was spent on educational activities. The board has decided to nearly double the education budget to over Rs 4 crore.

He said, "It is a matter of concern that not much is being spent on health care facilities. Just a few lakhs of rupees are being spent. The board will increase the budget for health care. We have been facing some issues due to the Waqf Amendment Act, 2013. If the Act is amended, the board will manage to generate more revenue".

The CEO Dr Qureshi said since 2003, 846 encroached upon Waqf properties had been recovered through courts or by way of compromise.

Educational Institutes
More than 390 privately managed madrasas, 7 schools and a college are being given supplementary financial assistance from the Board. Following are owned and operated by Haryana Waqf board.
 Mewat Engineering College situated in Haryana Nuh (city).
 Iqbal Model School at Ambala Cantonment
 Hali Islamia Public School at Panipat

See also

 State Protected Monuments in Haryana
 List of Monuments of National Importance in Haryana
 List of Indus Valley Civilization sites in Haryana, Punjab, Rajasthan, Gujarat, India & Pakistan
 National Parks & Wildlife Sanctuaries of Haryana
 List of Indian states and territories by highest point 
 Lists of Indian Monuments of National Importance
 Archaeological Survey of India
 Haryana Tourism

References

External links 
 
 District-wise list of Haryana Waqf Board owned properties
 405 Mosques directly managed by the Haryana Waqf Board
 List of 4,272 gazetted Mosques notified by the Haryana Govt
 24 gazetted Dargah directly managed by the Haryana Waqf Board
 List of 597 gazetted Dargah notified by the Haryana Govt

State agencies of Haryana
Government of Haryana
Islam in India
Government agencies established in 2003
2003 establishments in Haryana